YouBike, originally Taipei Bike Sharing System, is a public bicycle sharing service offered by the Taipei City Department of Transportation in a BOT collaboration with local manufacturer Giant Bicycles. As of 26 May 2016, service stations in the bike system are available in Taipei City, New Taipei City, Taoyuan City,  Hsinchu County, Hsinchu City, Hsinchu Science Park, Miaoli County, Taichung City, Chiayi City, Tainan City, Kaohsiung City, and Pingtung County. In Taipei City, rental is NT$5 for the first 30 minutes of use and adopts progressive tolls from NT$10 to NT$40 thereafter. No other fee, such as yearly deposit, is required. There is a 15-minute renewal restriction period at the station to which the bike was returned.

In 2014, the system saw 22 million rentals, double the 11 million rentals the previous year, with 196 rental stations circulating 6,046 bikes. As of February 2023, there are a total of 1,582 YouBike 1.0 rental stations and 5,246 YouBike 2.0 rental stations across Taiwan, with a total of 653 million rentals.

History
Launched in 2009, the system initially saw an unexpectedly small number of daily users in the trial district of Xinyi. This prompted the city's  to expand the system along the Taipei Metro lines and into several more districts. The slow initial adoption of YouBike rentals was overcome through adjusting the business model, such as by lowering rates (including making the first 30 minutes free of charge), and increasing ways to open an account (online via the YouBike website or at the kiosks). In April 2015, the Taipei Department of Transportation began charging YouBike riders for the first 30 minutes of use.

In 2020, the improved new system, YouBike 2.0, is taking its trials near National Taiwan University. The new system allows bike renting with only smartphones and reduces the limitations of station infrastructure. The government hopes that the new system will help build a larger scale of bike rental network.

In 2021, the Taipei City government has pledged to retire all of the first version of YouBike, YouBike 1.0, by the end of 2022 due to positive feedback on YouBike 2.0.

Youbike 1.0 service in Taipei City is retired since December 2022.

Bikes

According to the company, each of the system’s bikes costs about NT$10,000 (US$330) because they are designed to withstand frequent use. The bicycles are built to be used 13 times a day on average, much more often than the twice daily use that most other bicycles average. Each bicycle has an RFID tag for vehicle tracking and theft prevention.

References

External links

 Official Website
 Station Map

Transportation in Taiwan
Community bicycle programs
Bicycle sharing in Taiwan
2009 establishments in Taiwan